Aggunda  is a village in the southern state of Karnataka, India. It is located in the Arsikere taluk of Hassan district in Karnataka.

See also
 Hassan
 Districts of Karnataka

References

External links
 http://Hassan.nic.in/

Villages in Hassan district